R v McLean & Trinh is the Australian murder trial of Ben William McLean and Phu Ngoc Trinh.  It was tried in the Supreme Court of the Northern Territory in Darwin, Northern Territory.  They were convicted of the murders of two Thai prostitutes, Phuangsri Kroksamrang and Somjai Insamram, whose bodies were found in Adelaide River near Darwin on 1 March 2004.  They were convicted on 19 March 2005 and given a two consecutive sentences of life imprisonment, with a non-parole period of 25 years.

Crime 
On 1 March 2004, the bodies of Thai prostitutes Phuuangsri Kroksamrang and Somjai Imsamram were found in the Adelaide River near Darwin.  Two suspects, Ben William McLean and Phu Ngoc Trinh, were named as suspects and charged with the murders.

Initial plea 
They initially pleaded not guilty to the murders.

Claims that Hells Angels had forced them to kill the women 
In August 2004, the two suspects changed their plea to guilty to manslaughter on the basis that they claimed that the Hells Angels motorcycle gang, which is the largest motorcycle gang in Darwin, and is reputed to be associated with organised crime in Darwin, had forced them to kill the women in return to them owing money for drug-related debts.

This claim caused great concern amongst motorcyclists worldwide, and had worldwide news coverage from New Zealand, United States, Thailand, England, Taiwan and other countries with an interest in the case.

The Crown prosecutors did not accept the plea to a reduced sentence, and attempted to prosecute them for murder.

Admission that the claims had been a lie 
On 7 March 2005, the accused admitted that they had lied about the Hells Angels being involved, saying that he had lied so as to protect his friend.  The friend, however, continued to state that the allegations against Hells Angels were correct.

Verdict 
After deliberation, the two were found guilty of the murders, and sentenced to two consecutive terms of life imprisonment with a minimum non-parole period of 25 years.  Justice Mildred, who tried the case, stated that there was no evidence that the Hells Angels motorcycle gang had any involvement, and noted that both suspects had changed their stories many times during the case's progress, hence their statements could not be deemed to be reliable.

References 

 Sentencing Remarks
 Teens kill prostitutes as Hells Angels favour, Sydney Morning Herald, 25 February 2005
 Prostitutes thrown to crocs, News 24, 17 March 2005
 Two held after women thrown to crocodiles, Guardian Limited, 24 March 2005
 Darwin teens guilty of sex workers murders, ABC News Online, 19 March 2005
 Two Australian teenagers face court over murder of Thai sex workers, Asia Pacific, 11 March 2005
 Sex workers' killer awaiting sentencing, ABC News Online, 16 May 2005
 Mum tells of call from accused killer, ABC Northern Territory, 17 February 2005
 Murder accused claims he lied to protect friend, ABC Northern Territory, 7 March 2005
 Hells Angels scapegoats for murder, Biker News, 8 May 2004
 Motorcycle gang made me do it, Inside Bikes News, 7 August 2004
 Teenager threw Thai women in croc river, The Age, 3 August 2004
 Murder accused admits lying about Hells angels, ABC Northern Territory, 7 March 2005
 'Disturbed' man banned from sex workers trial, ABC Northern Territory, 17 February 2005
 Teenagers turn in to murderers, Hindustan Times, 19 March 2005
 Accused killer blames Hells Angels, New Zealand Biker News, 6 August 2004

2004 in Australian law
2005 in Australian law
2004 in case law
2005 in case law
Murder in the Northern Territory